Sister Mary Explains It All is a 2001 satirical dark comedy film written by Christopher Durang and directed by Marshall Brickman. The film, based upon Durang's 1979 play Sister Mary Ignatius Explains It All For You, and starring Diane Keaton in the title role, premiered on the Showtime network.

Background 
The project was filmed in Toronto in association with Columbia TriStar Television. The theme was originally covered in Christopher Durang's controversial 1979 stage play. In updating the character of Sister Mary, Durang read through 15 earlier drafts of the screenplay and discussed changes with Brickman and the producers. The original film title was Sister Mary, but Durang felt the proffered title was too generic, preferring the original theatrical title. For the film, Keaton was Brickman's choice for the role, which was cast against type, and she accepted the part because she thought she couldn't do it.

The Catholic League objected to the depiction of Catholicism in the film and took out a full-page advertisement in Variety to protest its broadcast. William A. Donohue, the president of the Catholic League, called for a boycott of Viacom, Showtime's parent company.

Plot 
Sister Mary (Diane Keaton) is an authoritarian Catholic nun who teaches children. Her teaching is heavily influenced by her fanatical beliefs. Four of her former pupils, Gary (Brian Benben), Aloysius (Wallace Langham), Angela (Laura San Giacomo) and Philomena (Jennifer Tilly), return to the school to show her how deeply her strict views on faith and sin have affected their lives.

Partial cast 
 Diane Keaton as Sister Mary Ignatius
 Brian Benben as Gary Sullivan
 Wallace Langham as Aloysius Benheim
 Laura San Giacomo as Angela DiMarco
 Jennifer Tilly as Philomena Rostovich
 Max Morrow as Thomas
 Martin Mull as Skeptical Husband
 Linda Kash as Skeptical Husband's Wife
 Victoria Tennant as Bitter Divorcee
 Michael Cameron as Young Gary Sullivan
 Gary Pearson as Man in Audience

Critical reception 
Steven Oxman of Variety wrote "Satire tends to date quickly, but Christopher Durang's 1980 black comedy criticizing Catholic rigidity, Sister Mary Ignatius Explains It All for You, still has some bite to it, which says a lot about the writer's incisive wit". He noted that the film did not have the same theatricality of Durang's initial work, and that with the original stageplay constructed for the audience's participation, the film included actors as representing broad characterizations of the play's audiences. Oxman concluded that the film might have perhaps remained truer to the original play had Sister Mary delivered her lecture directly to her unseen television audience.

Recognition 
Max Morrow received a 2002 Young Artist Award nomination for 'Best Performance in a TV Movie or Special — Supporting Young Actor' for his role of Thomas.

References

External links 
 Sister Mary Explains It All at the Internet Movie Database

2001 films
American comedy-drama films
American black comedy films
Films directed by Marshall Brickman
Films scored by Philippe Sarde
2000s English-language films
2000s American films